Soch is a 2002 Hindi language crime thriller mystery film starring Sanjay Kapoor, Raveena Tandon, Arbaaz Khan, Danny Denzongpa and Aditi Govitrikar among others. Soch is a remake of Alfred Hitchcock's 1951 film Strangers on a Train.

Plot
Raj Matthews has been selected the best actor in the Bollywood Cine Awards. He dedicates this award to his pretty co-star, Preeti Sardesai. Raj has everything going for him. He is rich, famous, handsome, and popular. Preeti thinks a lot about him and is even considering having an affair with him. Behind all the glitter and the glory lies an embittered wife — Madhulika — who is insecure, jealous of Preeti, and suspects her husband of having an affair with her. She will not tolerate any woman to come between her and Raj —  even if it means killing her or both of them.

The story takes a nasty turn when Madhulika is suddenly killed and all the fingers point towards Raj. Who killed Madhulika?

Cast
Sanjay Kapoor	  ... 	Raj Matthews
Raveena Tandon	  ... 	Preeti Sardesai
Aditi Govitrikar     ... 	Mrs. Madhulika Raj Matthews
Arbaaz Khan	  ... 	Om
Danny Denzongpa      ... 	Nautiyal
Tiku Talsania	  ... 	Lovely Shankar
Mushtaq Khan	          ... 	Film Director
Anjala Zaveri	  ... 	Special appearance in song "Dil Dhoonde"
Dadhi Pandey          ... Secretary to Lovely Shanker

Soundtrack

References

External links
 
2002 films
2000s Hindi-language films
Films scored by Jatin–Lalit
2002 crime thriller films
2000s mystery thriller films
Indian remakes of American films
Indian crime thriller films
Indian mystery thriller films